General elections were held in Suriname on 25 May 2015. The National Democratic Party won an absolute majority on its own for the first time.

Electoral system
The 51 seats in the National Assembly were elected using proportional representation in ten multi-member constituencies containing between two and seventeen seats. The ten electoral constituencies are coterminous with the ten administrative districts of Suriname. The National Assembly subsequently elects the president.

Results

Aftermath
Incumbent president Dési Bouterse was reelected by the National Assembly unopposed on 14 July 2015.

References

External links
Elections Suriname 

Elections in Suriname
Suriname
Suriname
2015 in Suriname